Eduard Savelievich Kolmanovsky (9 January 1923 – 27 July 1994) was a Soviet and Russian composer. He was awarded a USSR State Prize in 1984 and named a People's Artist of the USSR in 1991. A large part of his songs are dedicated to the themes of patriotic consciousness and civic awareness. Among them are:  I Love You, Life  (1958),  Do the Russians Want War?  (1961),  Alyosha  (1966).

References

External links 
 

1923 births
1994 deaths
People from Mogilev
Belarusian Jews
Soviet film score composers
Male film score composers
Russian male composers
Russian male songwriters
Recipients of the USSR State Prize
People's Artists of the USSR
People's Artists of the RSFSR
20th-century composers
20th-century classical musicians
Soviet songwriters
20th-century Russian male musicians